USS Natalia (SP-1251) was a United States Navy patrol vessel in commission from 1917 to 1918

Natalia was built as a private motorboat of the same name in 1909 at either Stamford, Connecticut, or Gloucester, Massachusetts, to a design by Whittelsey & Whitaker. On 8 May 1917 the U.S. Navy acquired her from her owner, John Hayes Hammond, Jr., of either Gloucester or Stamford, for use as a section patrol boat during World War I. She was commissioned the same day as USS Natalia (SP-1251).

Assigned to the 1st Naval District in northern New England, Natalia entered service as a section patrol boat. However, she proved unsuitable for naval use and was returned to Hammond on 5 July 1918.

Notes

References

Department of the Navy Naval History and Heritage Command Online Library of Selected Images: U.S. Navy Ships: USS Natalia (SP-1251), 1917-1918. Originally the civilian motor boat Natalia.
NavSource Online: Section Patrol Craft Photo Archive Natalia (SP 1251)

Patrol vessels of the United States Navy
World War I patrol vessels of the United States
Ships built in Stamford, Connecticut
Ships built in Gloucester, Massachusetts
1909 ships